Artūrs Plēsnieks (born 21 January 1992) is a Latvian weightlifter. He has received several medals at junior competitions, including gold medal at Junior World Championships 2010 (385 kg). Plēsnieks has competed in several World Championships.

Major results

References

External links
 
 
 
 

1992 births
Living people
World Weightlifting Championships medalists
Latvian male weightlifters
Olympic weightlifters of Latvia
Weightlifters at the 2012 Summer Olympics
Weightlifters at the 2016 Summer Olympics
People from Tērvete Municipality
European Weightlifting Championships medalists
Weightlifters at the 2020 Summer Olympics
Medalists at the 2020 Summer Olympics
Olympic bronze medalists for Latvia
Olympic medalists in weightlifting
21st-century Latvian people